Sir Timothy Victor Holroyde, PC (born 18 August 1955), styled The Rt. Hon. Lord Justice Holroyde, is an English Court of Appeal judge, formerly a judge of the High Court of Justice of England and Wales, Queen's Bench Division. He was appointed to the Court of Appeal in October 2017. He was sworn of the Privy Council in 2017. In 2015 he was appointed a member of the Sentencing Council for England and Wales, and served as its Chairman between 2018 and 2022. In June 2022 he was appointed Vice-President of the Court of Appeal (Criminal Division), succeeding Lord Justice Fulford.

Tim Holroyde was educated at Bristol Grammar School and Wadham College, Oxford, and was called to the bar in 1977. As a barrister, he practised from Exchange Chambers, Liverpool. He was appointed Queen's Counsel in 1996, and was appointed to the High Court in January 2009. From 2012 he was a Presiding Judge of the Northern Circuit.

As a barrister, he appeared as counsel for the prosecution in the trial that followed the 2004 Morecambe Bay cockling disaster.

In 2012 Holroyde presided over the seven-month trial of Asil Nadir on fraud charges.  Other cases included the trial of Anjem Choudary in 2016 for terrorist-related offences, and that of Dale Cregan in 2013 for crimes including the murders of PC Fiona Bone and PC Nicola Hughes. In 2021, he presided over the British Post Office scandal case in the Court of Appeal, in which the convictions of 39 sub-postmasters for theft, false accounting and/or fraud were quashed.

References

1955 births
Living people
Alumni of Wadham College, Oxford
British barristers
21st-century English judges
Lords Justices of Appeal
Queen's Bench Division judges
Knights Bachelor
Members of the Privy Council of the United Kingdom
People educated at Bristol Grammar School